Santa Clara Valley Transportation Authority light rail is a light rail transit system that serves the Santa Clara County in the U.S. state of California. The system has  of tracks and is operated by the Santa Clara Valley Transportation Authority (VTA), which oversees public transit services in the county. The system serves over 32,000 passengers a day as of fiscal year 2007.

The initial segment of the VTA light rail between the Civic Center and Old Ironsides stations began service on December 11, 1987. In 1988 and 1990, the system was extended south of Civic Center to Downtown San Jose and Tamien station. Another  segment to Santa Teresa and Almaden stations was added to the system in April 1991, completing the entire Guadalupe section. In December 1999, the system underwent another extension with the completion of the Tasman West section and began services to Mountain View. The system was extended to I-880/Milpitas in 2001 and to Hostetter station in 2004 as part of the Tasman East extension. In the same year, the Capitol extension to Alum Rock station was also finished. The latest section, the Vasona extension, was completed in 2005, connecting Campbell to Downtown San Jose.

 the system consists of 59 stations. The majority of stations, 39, are located in San Jose. Seven stations are in Sunnyvale and four are in Mountain View. Campbell, Milpitas, and Santa Clara each have three stations.

VTA closed Evelyn station on March 16, 2015 in order to build a second track between Mountain View and Whisman stations.

Stations

Former stations

Notes

 All station names are based on the official system map.
 For stations serviced by multiple lines, lines are listed in the order of opening.
 This station's northbound and southbound platforms are located a block apart from each other. The northbound platform is located on 1st Street while the southbound platform is located on 2nd Street.

References

 List
Santa Clara Valley Transportation Authority light rail
Santa Clara Valley Transportation Authority
Santa Clara